Georgios Karpouzis (born 20 April 1958) is a Greek former swimmer. He competed in three events at the 1976 Summer Olympics.

References

1958 births
Living people
Greek male swimmers
Olympic swimmers of Greece
Swimmers at the 1976 Summer Olympics
Sportspeople from Alexandria